Sugar Ridge is an unincorporated community in Wood County, Ohio, United States.  It lies along Ohio State Route 25, north of Bowling Green and just west of Interstate 75.

History
Sugar Ridge was platted in 1882. A post office called Sugar Ridge was established in 1883, and remained in operation until 1954.

Notable person
Bob Evans, the founder of Bob Evans Restaurants, was born at Sugar Ridge in 1918.

References

Unincorporated communities in Wood County, Ohio
Unincorporated communities in Ohio